Edwin Percy Phillips (18 February 1884 – 12 April 1967) was a South African botanist and taxonomist, noted for his monumental work The Genera of South African Flowering Plants first published in 1926.

Phillips was born in Sea Point, Cape Town, and attended the South African College, which later became the University of Cape Town, where he graduated under Prof. Henry Harold Welch Pearson, obtaining a BA in 1903, an MA in 1908 and a DSc in 1915 for a treatise on the flora of the Leribe Plateau in Lesotho.

He was the son of Ralph Edwards Phillips and Edith Minnie Crowder. He married Edith Isabel Dawson about 1912 and they had 2 daughters before her death c1948. He secondly married Susan Kriel c1949. Phillips named the genus Susanna belonging to the family Asteraceae after her. He died in Cape Town.

Timeline of career
1907 Herbarium assistant at South African Museum (Prof. Pearson honorary curator)
1910 Royal Botanic Gardens, Kew - with Otto Stapf and John Hutchinson described Proteaceae for Flora Capensis.
1911 Curator of South African Museum Herbarium, succeeding Pearson who moved to the Bolus Herbarium
1911 Joined Percy Sladen Memorial Expedition to the Kamiesberge
1913 Field work on Leribe Plateau in Lesotho published in Ann. S.Afr. Mus. 16:1-379(1917)
1918 Curator of National Herbarium, Pretoria
1926 Botanical Survey Memoir No. 10 - The Genera of South African Flowering Plants arranged according to Dalla Torre & Harms.
1931 "South African Grasses"
1939 "The Weeds of South Africa"
1939-44 Chief of the Division of Botany and Plant Pathology, succeeding I. B. Pole-Evans
1944 Edited  Christo Albertyn Smith and Estelle Van Hoepen's The Common Names of South African Plants
1951 Second edition of The Genera of South African Flowering Plants

Awards, honours and memberships
Fellow of the Linnean Society of London
Fellow of the Royal Society of South Africa
Carnegie Travelling Scholarship to US and Canada in 1934
Secretary SA Biological Society 1919-44, President in 1925, Senior Capt. Scott Medal
Council of SA Association for the Advancement of Science, President in 1942
SA Medal 1935
Scientific Liaison Officer for the C.S.I.R. in Washington, DC 1946-48
Secretary of Mountain Club of South Africa
Leucadendron phillipsii Hutch.
Agathosma phillipsii Dümmer
Vol. 25 of Flowering Plants of Africa dedicated to him

Selected works 

A Contribution to the Knowledge of the South African Proteaceae - 1913
Contributions to the Flora of South Africa - 1913
Descriptions of New Plants from the Gift Berg collected by the Percy Sladen Memorial Expedition - 1913
A list of the Phanerogams and Ferns collected by Mr. P.C. Keytel on the Island of Tristan da Cunha, 1908-1909 - 1913
A note on the Flora of the Great Winterhoek Range (South African Journal of Science) - 1918
A Preliminary List of the Known Poisonous Plants found in South Africa (Botanical Survey of South Africa. Memoir) - 1926
An Introduction to the Study of the South African Grasses: With notes on their structure, distribution, cultivation, etc. (South African agricultural series) - 1931
Life and Living: A story for children - 1933
Civilization and our Biological Past
Herbaria and Botanical Institutions in the United States of America and Canada: In relation to similar institutions in South Africa : report on a visit ... of the Carnegie Corporation of New York - 1935
The Advancement of Science - 1943
The Genera of South African Flowering Plants (Botanical Survey Memoir) - 1951

References

External links

1884 births
1967 deaths
Botanists with author abbreviations
20th-century South African botanists
South African mountain climbers
South African taxonomists
Presidents of the Southern Africa Association for the Advancement of Science